Sir William Henry Cowan  (22 May 1862 – 11 January 1932) was a politician in the United Kingdom.

The son of William Cowan and Elizabeth Giles, he was educated at Merchiston Castle School, Edinburgh Collegiate School and the University of Edinburgh.

He was elected as Liberal Member of Parliament (MP) for Guildford from 1906 to 1910 and for Aberdeenshire Eastern from 1910 to 1922, then as a Unionist for Islington North from 1923 to 1929. As a parliamentarian, Cowan became interested in matters concerning immigration including promoting immigration of British families to dominions such as Australia.

As of 1928, he was chairman of Parkinson and W. and B. Cowan, Limited, a manufacturer of gas meters and gas cookers.

He was knighted in the 1917 Birthday Honours.

References

External links 

1862 births
1932 deaths
People educated at Merchiston Castle School
People educated at Edinburgh Collegiate School
Alumni of the University of Edinburgh
Knights Bachelor
Liberal Party (UK) MPs for English constituencies
Members of the Parliament of the United Kingdom for Scottish constituencies
Politicians awarded knighthoods
Scottish Liberal Party MPs
Conservative Party (UK) MPs for English constituencies
UK MPs 1906–1910
UK MPs 1910
UK MPs 1910–1918
UK MPs 1918–1922
UK MPs 1923–1924
UK MPs 1924–1929
Politics of Guildford
National Liberal Party (UK, 1922) politicians
Members of the Parliament of the United Kingdom for Guildford